Rachel Anne McAdams (born November 17, 1978) is a Canadian actress. After graduating from a theatre degree program at York University in 2001, she worked in Canadian television and film productions, such as the drama film Perfect Pie (2002), for which she received a Genie Award nomination, the comedy film My Name Is Tanino (2002), and the comedy series Slings and Arrows (2003–2005), for which she won a Gemini Award.

In 2002, she made her Hollywood film debut in the comedy The Hot Chick. She rose to fame in 2004 with the comedy Mean Girls and the romantic drama The Notebook. In 2005, she starred in the romantic comedy Wedding Crashers, the psychological thriller Red Eye, and the comedy-drama The Family Stone. She was hailed by the media as Hollywood's new "it girl", and received a BAFTA Award nomination for Best Rising Star.

After a brief sabbatical, she returned to prominence in 2009 by appearing in the political thriller State of Play, the romance The Time Traveler's Wife, and the mystery film Sherlock Holmes. In 2010, she appeared in the star vehicle comedy film Morning Glory, and starred in Midnight in Paris (2011), The Vow (2012), and About Time (2013). In 2015, she starred in the second season of the HBO anthology crime drama series True Detective, and portrayed journalist Sacha Pfeiffer in the drama Spotlight. For the latter, she was nominated for the Academy Award for Best Supporting Actress. This was followed by roles in the superhero film Doctor Strange (2016) and its 2022 sequel, the romantic drama Disobedience (2017), and the comedies Game Night (2018) and Eurovision Song Contest: The Story of Fire Saga (2020).

Early life
McAdams was born on November 17, 1978 in London, Ontario, Canada, to nurse Sandra ( Gale) and truck driver Lance McAdams. She grew up in St. Thomas in a Protestant household. The eldest of three children, she has a younger sister, Kayleen (born 1982), who is a make-up artist; and a younger brother, Daniel, a personal trainer. McAdams is of Scottish, English, Irish and Welsh descent. Her maternal fifth great-grandfather, James Gray, was a Loyalist Ranger during the American Revolution and fled to Canada after the Battles of Saratoga.

McAdams began figure skating when she was four, but turned down an opportunity to move to Toronto when she was nine for pair skating training. She skated competitively until she was 18, winning regional awards. She has said that skating prepared her for acting by teaching her to be "in tune" with her body.

McAdams attended Myrtle Street Public School and Central Elgin Collegiate Institute. She said that she did not enjoy academic work and often pretended to be sick to avoid going to school. Nonetheless, she was active in student life. In addition to playing sports (including volleyball, badminton, and soccer), she was on the student council, participated in the Crime Stoppers program, and was a member of the Peer Helping Team. She worked at a McDonald's restaurant during summer holidays for three years.

She developed an interest in performing when she was seven, and while her parents did not discourage her, they did not "go out and find [her] an agent." She attended Disney and Shakespeare summer camps as a child. From age 12, she participated in Original Kids Theatre Company, London productions, and in her late teens directed children's theatre productions. She was also involved in school stage productions, most notably winning a performance award at the Sears Ontario Drama Festival. She was inspired by two of her teachers, who taught her English and drama, respectively, in grades 11 and 12. She intended to take cultural studies at the University of Western Ontario before being persuaded by her drama teacher that a professional acting career was a viable option. 

She enrolled in York University's four-year theatre program and graduated with a Bachelor of Fine Arts honours degree in 2001. While there, she worked with the Toronto-based Necessary Angel Theatre Company.

Career

2001–2003: Early work
In 2001, McAdams made her television debut in the MTV pilot Shotgun Love Dolls as Beth Swanson, which was filmed during spring break from York University. She also made her Canadian film debut that year in the comedy My Name is Tanino. The Italian-Canadian co-production was filmed in Sicily when McAdams was 22 years old, and it marked her first time on an airplane. McAdams later earned a Genie Award nomination in Canada for her role in the drama Perfect Pie. 

In 2002, she made her Hollywood film debut with Rob Schneider and Anna Faris in the comedy The Hot Chick, which McAdams has described as a "huge milestone" in her career. She played a catty high school student who swaps bodies with Schneider's character, a small-time criminal. Kevin Thomas of the Los Angeles Times felt she "emerges as a young actress of much promise". Afterwards, McAdams returned to Canada to star as Kate McNab in Slings and Arrows, a comedy mini-series about backstage theatre life at the fictional New Burbage Shakespearean Festival. She was written out of the second season of the program following her success in the United States. She received two Gemini Award nominations for her work on the program, winning one.

2004–2005: Breakthrough
McAdams's break-out role came in 2004, when she starred in the comedy film Mean Girls opposite Lindsay Lohan, Lacey Chabert, and Amanda Seyfried, based on Rosalind Wiseman's book Queen Bees and Wannabes. McAdams was 24 years old when she was cast as the mean high school queen bee Regina George, and she modelled her character on Alec Baldwin's performance in the drama Glengarry Glen Ross (1992). Mike Clark of USA Today praised her "comic flair" while Jenny McCartney of The Daily Telegraph found her "delightfully hateful." Mick LaSalle of the San Francisco Chronicle felt that "McAdams brings glamour and magnetism to Regina, but also the right hint of comic distance." The film grossed $129million worldwide and earned McAdams two MTV Movie Awards. Mean Girls later reached No. 12 in an Entertainment Weekly list of the Greatest Ever High School Movies. Tina Fey, who co‑starred in the film and wrote the screenplay, has credited McAdams with teaching her how to act in front of a camera rather than an audience: "She's a film actor. She's not pushing. And so I kind of learned that lesson from watching her."

Later in 2004, McAdams starred opposite fellow Canadian Ryan Gosling in the romantic drama The Notebook, based on Nicholas Sparks' novel of the same name. She played Allie Hamilton, a wealthy Southern belle who has a forbidden love affair with Gosling's poor labourer, Noah Calhoun. McAdams spent time in Charleston, South Carolina, prior to filming to familiarize herself with the Southern accent, and took ballet and etiquette classes. Filming took place from late 2002 to early 2003. Although McAdams and Gosling became romantically involved in 2005, they had a combative relationship on set. "We inspired the worst in each other," Gosling has said. "It was a strange experience, making a love story and not getting along with your co-star in any way." At one point, Gosling asked the film's director Nick Cassavetes to "bring somebody else in for my off-camera shot" because he felt McAdams was being uncooperative. Stephen Holden of The New York Times praised the "spontaneous and combustible" performances of the two leads while Roger Ebert was won over by the "beauty and clarity" of McAdams's performance. Michael Wilmington of the Chicago Tribune declared her "a real discovery" who "infuses young Allie with that radiant, breathlessly winning ingénue grace and charm that breaks hearts". The film grossed over $115million worldwide. McAdams won an MTV Movie Award and four Teen Choice Awards. Entertainment Weekly has said that the movie contains the All-Time Best Movie Kiss while the Los Angeles Times has included a scene from the film in a list of the 50 Classic Movie Kisses. The Notebook has appeared on many Most Romantic Movies lists. "I'm so grateful to have a film that people respond to in that way", McAdams told Elle in 2011. "It was a big deal."

In 2005, McAdams starred with Owen Wilson, Vince Vaughn, and Bradley Cooper in the romantic comedy Wedding Crashers. McAdams played the daughter of an influential politician, who is caught in a love triangle with Wilson and Cooper's characters. McAdams listened repeatedly to Fleetwood Mac's 1975 song "Landslide" to prepare for emotional scenes, and Wilson has said the song made her cry immediately: "It was like turning on a faucet." She trained for a sailing certification for a boating sequence because her character was said to be an accomplished sailor. Manohla Dargis of The New York Times felt McAdams "makes the most of her underdeveloped character" and "grows more appealing with every new role". Brian Lowry of Variety found her "a beguiling presence" who "actually creates a real character – a rarity for females in one of these lad-mag escapades". From a production budget of $40million, the film grossed over $285million worldwide.

Afterwards, McAdams starred opposite Cillian Murphy in Wes Craven's psychological thriller Red Eye, where she played a young hotel manager who is held captive by Murphy's character while aboard a red-eye flight. Craven has said McAdams was the only actress he considered for the part. She was drawn to the relatable qualities of her character: "She was not some sweaty, tank-top-wearing, Uzi-carrying super woman". Robert Koehler of Variety found her "increasingly impressive" while Roger Ebert of the Chicago Sun-Times asserted that "she brings more presence and credibility to her role than is really expected; she acts without betraying the slightest awareness that she's inside a genre. Her performance qualifies her for heavy-duty roles." Upon release, the film, which was made on a budget of $26million, earned over $95million at the worldwide box office. In late 2005, McAdams starred with Sarah Jessica Parker and Diane Keaton in the seasonal family comedy-drama The Family Stone, which gave McAdams an opportunity to play a dishevelled and sardonic sister, rather than the usual "obvious" girlfriend or wife roles. She was eager to work with Keaton and remarked, "It's never about line counts for me. It's about the people I get to work with." Justin Chang of Variety noted that "a deglammed but still radiant McAdams proves once again that she's the real deal, delivering a deliciously feisty performance". Manohla Dargis of The New York Times felt that her "engaging screen presence holds your attention and sympathy despite the handicap presented by her character's personality." The film was a commercial success: it cost $18million to make and grossed over $92million worldwide.

2006–2010: Career hiatus and return

At this point in her career, McAdams was hailed as "the next Julia Roberts" and the new "Hollywood it girl". Vanity Fair invited McAdams, along with actresses Scarlett Johansson and Keira Knightley, to appear on its March 2006 cover, the annual Hollywood issue. Upon arrival on the photo set, McAdams discovered it was a nude session, declined and left. She later parted ways with her publicist at the time, who had not informed her in advance. Knightley later recounted, "Quite early on Rachel just said, 'No, I'm not into that.' She's a lovely girl, and I really respect her for doing that." When asked about the incident in 2008, McAdams had "no regrets". McAdams took a break from her film career from 2006 to 2007. "There were a lot of cooks in the kitchen, a lot of voices around me, and I wanted to step away so I could hear my own voice again", McAdams said in 2013. "Truthfully, I never really wanted to be a big movie star. I never even wanted to work outside of Canada, or outside of the theatre." During that period, McAdams turned down roles in the films The Devil Wears Prada (2006), Casino Royale (2006), Mission: Impossible III (2006), Iron Man (2008), and Get Smart (2008). In February 2006, she made a one-off stage appearance in The Vagina Monologues at St. Lawrence Centre for the Arts, Toronto to raise funds for V-Day. That same year, McAdams received a Rising Star Award nomination from the British Academy of Film and Television Arts and hosted the Academy Awards for Technical Achievement.

McAdams returned to her film career in 2008. She starred with Pierce Brosnan and Chris Cooper in the 1940s film noir Married Life where she played Kay Nesbitt, a young widow who wins the affections of Brosnan and Cooper's older characters. In preparation for the role, McAdams studied old films, particularly those of Kim Novak. She has said the film shoot re-energized and re-inspired her and made her eager to continue working more often again. Lisa Schwarzbaum of Entertainment Weekly found McAdams "a particularly delightful vision after her two-year intermission". Todd McCarthy of Variety criticized her break from the big screen but felt that, despite a performance of "tender feeling", "her natural vivaciousness and spontaneity are straitjacketed" by the film noir format. The film had a limited release and was a box-office failure. It grossed just over $2million worldwide, failing to recoup its production budget of $12million.

Afterwards, McAdams starred with Tim Robbins and Michael Peña in the road trip comedy-drama The Lucky Ones, a story about three Iraq War soldiers on a brief road trip back in the United States. She trained at a real boot camp, at Fort Campbell, Kentucky, prior to filming. In 2011, McAdams said that Colee Dunn was "probably one of my favorite characters I've ever played". The film also had a limited release and Laura Kern of The New York Times found her "luminous as always" while Roger Ebert of the Chicago Sun-Times hailed the performance as "her coming of age as an actress". "Previously she has been seen mostly as a hot chick or an idealized sweetheart", he wrote. "Here she is feisty, vulnerable, plucky, warm, funny ... Watch the poignancy of the scene when she meets her boyfriend's family." Owen Gleiberman of Entertainment Weekly found her "feisty, gorgeous, and as mercurial as a mood ring". The Lucky Ones is the least commercially successful film of McAdams's career as of 2012, having grossed just $266,967 worldwide.

In 2009, McAdams starred with Russell Crowe, Helen Mirren and Ben Affleck in the political thriller State of Play, based on the BBC drama television series of the same name. McAdams played Della Frye, an online reporter who investigates a possible conspiracy with Crowe's character, a veteran print journalist. McAdams visited The Washington Posts offices and met with politicians on Capitol Hill for her research. Gleiberman of Entertainment Weekly felt she was "perfectly cast as an ambitious wonkette" while Sukhdev Sandhu of The Daily Telegraph noted that "McAdams, with her lively eyes and large, expressive forehead, holds her own against Crowe. Mercifully, she avoids any temptation to play girly and demure to his grizzled alpha male." The film grossed over $87million worldwide. Also in 2009, McAdams starred opposite Eric Bana in the science fiction romantic drama The Time Traveler's Wife, based on Audrey Niffenegger's best-selling novel of the same name. McAdams fell "madly in love" with the novel, but was initially slightly hesitant to accept the role because Clare Abshire, the long-suffering wife is a "character that people have already cast in their heads". Peter Travers of Rolling Stone said, "I'd watch the vibrant Rachel McAdams and Eric Bana in anything, but The Time Traveler's Wife is pushing it." Betsy Sharkey of the Los Angeles Times found her "luminous [yet], sadly, her facility as an actress is mostly wasted." Writing in The Chicago Tribune, Michael Phillips, in an otherwise tepid review, said of her performance: "Every scene she's in, even the silly ones, becomes better—truer, often against long odds—because she's in it. Her work feels emotionally spontaneous yet technically precise. She has an unusually easy touch with both comedy and drama, and she never holds a melodramatic moment hostage." The film was a commercial success, earning over $101million worldwide.

In late 2009, McAdams starred in the mystery/action-adventure film Sherlock Holmes with Robert Downey, Jr. and Jude Law. She played Irene Adler, an antagonist and love interest of Downey's title character Sherlock Holmes, and welcomed the opportunity to play a character who is "her own boss and a real free spirit". Todd McCarthy of Variety felt her character was "not very well integrated into the rest of the story, a shortcoming the normally resourceful McAdams is unable to do much about". A. O. Scott of The New York Times stated, "Ms.McAdams is a perfectly charming actress and performs gamely as the third wheel of this action-bromance tricycle. But Irene feels in this movie more like a somewhat cynical commercial contrivance. She offers a little something for the ladies and also something for the lads, who, much as they may dig fights and explosions and guns and chases, also like girls." The film was a major commercial success, earning over $524million at the worldwide box office.

In 2010, McAdams starred with her The Family Stone co-star Diane Keaton and Harrison Ford in the comedy Morning Glory. She played a television producer attempting to improve the poor ratings of a morning television program. The film was billed as a starring vehicle for McAdams. She initially felt she was unsuited to the role saying, "I'm not funny. So I said, 'if you need me to be funny, you might want to look somewhere else'". The film's director Roger Michell had a number of dinners with McAdams and persuaded her to join the cast. Since working with Keaton, McAdams has described her as a mentor figure. Kenneth Turan of the Los Angeles Times said McAdams "gives the kind of performance we go to the movies for" while Roger Ebert of the Chicago Sun-Times felt she played "as lovable a lead as anyone since Amy Adams in Junebug" in an otherwise "routine" movie. Lou Lumenick of the New York Post was impressed by "her gift for physical comedy", as was Varietys Andrew Barker. While Manohla Dargis of The New York Times felt she "plays her role exceptionally well" and is "effortlessly likable", it called on Hollywood to give her parts "worthy" of her talent. "Ms.McAdams has to rely on her dimples to get by. She does, but she could do better." The film was a modest commercial success, grossing $58million worldwide from a production budget of $40million. McAdams later expressed her disappointment that the film failed to find a larger audience.

2011–2014: Work with auteurs
In 2011, McAdams starred in Woody Allen's fantasy romantic comedy Midnight in Paris with her Wedding Crashers co-star Owen Wilson and Michael Sheen. The film opened the 2011 Cannes Film Festival. McAdams played Inez, the shrewish fiancée of Wilson's character Gil. Allen wrote McAdams' part for her, after hearing "glowing reports" from his friend and her former co-star Diane Keaton. He said that he was "crazy about Rachel" and wanted to give her the opportunity to play something other than "beautiful girls". The film was shot on location in Paris and McAdams has said that the experience "will always have a great place in my heart". Hadley Freeman The Guardian criticized that she "has morphed from the sweet thing in Wedding Crashers to the dream-crushing bitch that, according to American comedies, women become once they ensnare their man". Richard Corliss of Time "felt sorry for McAdams, whose usually winning presence is ground into hostile cliché". However, Kenneth Turan of the Los Angeles Times felt she "deftly handles a part that is less amiable than usual for her" and A. O. Scott of The New York Times found her "superbly speeded-up". It became Allen's highest-grossing film ever in North America and was the most commercially successful independent film of 2011. With a production budget of $17million, the film has grossed over $151million worldwide. McAdams, along with six other members of the cast, received a Screen Actors Guild Award for Outstanding Performance by a Cast in a Motion Picture nomination. Allen won the Academy Award for Best Original Screenplay and the film itself was nominated for three other Academy Awards, including Best Picture.

McAdams reprised her role as Irene Adler in the mystery/action-adventure sequel Sherlock Holmes: A Game of Shadows, but the female lead role was played by Noomi Rapace. Joel Silver, the film's producer, has said that "we always intended to have a different kind of girl for each movie" in the vein of Bond girls. He found it "complicated" to persuade McAdams to return in a smaller role: "She loved being with us, but she hoped to have a bigger role." Joe Morgenstern of The Wall Street Journal felt "she vanishes all too soon in this overproduced, self-enchanted sequel, and so does the spirit of bright invention that made the previous film such a pleasant surprise." Scott Mendelson of The Huffington Post remarked that she "exhibits far more personality and roguish charm in her few moments here than she did in all of the previous film. Freed from the constraints of being the de-facto love interest, McAdams relishes the chance to go full-villain." The film has grossed over $543million worldwide.

In 2012, McAdams starred opposite Channing Tatum in the romantic drama The Vow, based on a true story. McAdams and Tatum played a newlywed couple who try to rebuild their relationship after a car crash leaves the wife with no recollections of who he is or their marriage. McAdams was drawn to the "roller coaster" faced by her character and found it interesting that the story was told "through the guy's eyes". A. O. Scott of The New York Times stated that "the dimply and adorable Rachel McAdams" brings "enough physical charm and emotional warmth to distract from the threadbare setting and the paper-thin plot". Joseph Amodio of Newsday felt that McAdams, "exuding her usual uncanny warmth on-screen", "is the real draw". However, Betsy Sharkey of the Los Angeles Times felt she was "wasted" in the role: "She is such an appealing actress that it's hard not to wish someone could make better use" of her. Mary Pols of Time found the film an example of McAdams "coasting" in "unabashedly romantic" movies and asserted that "she's a much more versatile and clever actress" than such projects would suggest. The film, financed for $30million, was a major commercial success and became her biggest box-office hit in a leading role. It topped the U.S. box office and has grossed over $196million worldwide.

In 2013, McAdams co-starred opposite Ben Affleck in Terrence Malick's romantic drama To the Wonder. McAdams played a horse ranch worker in Oklahoma and the love interest of Affleck's character. She found Malick to be an "incredibly helpful" director; they discussed her character in detail and he took her on a tour of the local town, pointing out which house she would have grown up in and where she would have attended school. Upon its limited theatrical American release, the film polarized film critics. Oliver Lyttelton of IndieWire noted that "McAdams has the least to do of the principals, but is wonderfully haunted and sad in her brief appearances". Afterwards, McAdams starred in Brian De Palma's erotic thriller Passion opposite Noomi Rapace. They played two business executives engaged in a power struggle. De Palma saw McAdams' performance in Mean Girls and decided to cast her as Christine. The movie was released in selected theatres in the US. Gleiberman of Entertainment Weekly noted that McAdams "uses her sexy billboard smile and emphatic delivery to nail a certain type of troublemaker boss who embeds her aggression in pert 'sincerity'" while Robert Abele of the Los Angeles Times remarked: "McAdams and Rapace are gesturally awkward and wildly miscast—more sorority sisters in a spat than cross-generational power antagonists."

In 2013, McAdams starred in Richard Curtis' romantic comedy-drama About Time opposite Domhnall Gleeson. Zooey Deschanel was originally slated to play McAdams's role but dropped out shortly before filming began. A fan of Curtis for years, McAdams wanted to work with him on what he stated would be his last project as a director. The film was a commercial success at the international box office, and McAdams had a positive reception among critics, with Leslie Felperin of Variety praising her and Gleeson for their "radiant, believable chemistry" which "keeps the film aloft." The following year, McAdams starred opposite Philip Seymour Hoffman in an adaptation of John le Carré's espionage thriller A Most Wanted Man, directed by Anton Corbijn. McAdams' attempt at a German accent was criticised by some reviewers. Richard Lawson of Vanity Fair noted that McAdams had a "little less success with her accent" than her co-star Hoffman but, nonetheless, she "proves as intelligent, soulful, and magnetic a presence as ever". In late 2014, McAdams received a star on Canada's Walk of Fame.

2015–2016: Spotlight and beyond

In 2015, McAdams starred with Michael Keaton, Mark Ruffalo and Stanley Tucci as journalist Sacha Pfeiffer in Tom McCarthy's Spotlight, a drama about the child-abuse scandal in Boston's Catholic Church. To prepare for her role, McAdams spent time with Pfeiffer. The film garnered universal critical acclaim, mainly for its detailed story and the performances of the ensemble cast, and won the Academy Award for Best Picture. Though Justin Chang of Variety felt McAdams imbued her character with "sensitivity and grit", he was nonetheless surprised by her subsequent Academy Award nomination: "[The performance] has the sort of fine-grained subtlety that voters too rarely notice. Take another look at that scene in which she gently, skillfully encourages an abuse survivor to lay bare his most lacerating secrets—a small master class in how the simple act of listening can become a conduit for compassion." For her role, McAdams received nominations for the Academy Award for Best Supporting Actress, Critics' Choice Movie Award for Best Supporting Actress and Screen Actors Guild Award nominations in the categories of Outstanding Performance by a Female Actor in a Supporting Role and Outstanding Performance by a Cast in a Motion Picture.

She next starred with her Wedding Crashers co-star Bradley Cooper, Emma Stone and John Krasinski in Cameron Crowe's romantic comedy-drama Aloha. She played the ex-girlfriend of Cooper's character, who is married to Krasinski's character with two children. While the film received a negative reaction and controversy from critics and audiences alike, Wesley Morris of Grantland remarked: "Someone who can speak Crowe's language really helps. McAdams might be the best he's ever had ... [She] puts the perfect amount of air in her lines, giving the words a lightness that conflates optimism, amusement, and resignation. She's never seemed lovelier, more instinctive, or more present." Mark Olsen of the Los Angeles Times felt she "plays likely the strongest, most rounded female character Crowe has ever written, a woman suddenly lips to lips with the life she has and the one she might have had, and the actress brings a grounded, unforced earthiness to the role that is a joy to watch."

She co-starred with Jake Gyllenhaal in the boxing drama Southpaw (2015), where she played the wife of Gyllenhaal's character. A.O. Scott of The New York Times conceded: "It features some pretty appealing players. There are worse things to see at the multiplex than Ms. McAdams playing a tough cookie standing by her man." She co-starred with James Franco, Charlotte Gainsbourg and Marie-Josée Croze in Wim Wenders' drama Every Thing Will Be Fine. The film received a U.S. limited release in December 2015. Guy Lodge of Variety remarked: "Poor McAdams, sporting sensible hair and a truly mystifying cod-Continental accent, continues her thankless run of needy, tossed-aside love interests in big-name auteur projects." That same year, McAdams returned to television and starred as Det. Ani Bezzerides in the second season of HBO's anthology crime drama True Detective with her Wedding Crashers co-star Vince Vaughn, Colin Farrell and Taylor Kitsch. Richard Vine of The Guardian remarked: "If there's anyone with any chance of enjoying a McConaughaissance here it's probably McAdams – an actor whose characters are more usually associated with the death of the romcom than murders involving people with eyes burned out by acid. Here, her Ani is a convincing mess." She received a nomination for the Critics' Choice Television Award for Best Actress in a Movie/Miniseries for her role. Also in 2015, McAdams played Buttercup in a one-off, staged LACMA Live Read of The Princess Bride.

The following year, McAdams voiced The Mother of The Little Girl in an animated version of The Little Prince, and co-starred with Benedict Cumberbatch in the Marvel Cinematic Universe superhero film Doctor Strange. Peter Debruge of Variety said McAdams played "the most competent—and human—of Marvel's window-dressing girlfriends," while Gregory Ellwood of Indiewire remarked: "It goes without saying that McAdams will never get the credit she deserves for transforming the barely sketched out role of Strange's former medical colleague Christine Palmer into a captivating three-dimensional character that feels like an integral part of the storyline even when she isn't." Also in 2016, McAdams narrated an audiobook version of L. M. Montgomery's novel Anne of Green Gables, released by Audible.

2018–present: Recent roles
After a year-long absence from the screen, McAdams co-starred with Jason Bateman in the comedy Game Night (2018). Glenn Kenny of The New York Times said the film served as a "reminder that Ms. McAdams is one of cinema's most accomplished and appealing comic actresses." Richard Lawson of Vanity Fair felt her character lacked "any real arc or motivation of her own", but "It's a testament to McAdams's talent and charm, then, that she doesn't get lost in the movie, asserting herself in every scene with a goofy brightness." She performed some of her own stunt driving in a getaway scene. 

Later in 2018, McAdams starred opposite Rachel Weisz in Sebastián Lelio's romantic drama Disobedience, based on Naomi Alderman's novel. Manohla Dargis of The New York Times said McAdams "does some lovely work here to convey a woman agonizing over her existential situation". In 2020, she co-starred with Will Ferrell in the Netflix musical comedy film Eurovision Song Contest: The Story of Fire Saga.

McAdams reprised her role as Christine Palmer in the superhero sequel Doctor Strange in the Multiverse of Madness. Released in May 2022, the film garnered mixed reviews. McAdams is set to star in Are You There God? It's Me, Margaret, a film adaptation of Judy Blume's novel of the same name, scheduled for an April 2023 release.

Philanthropy

Environmental activism
McAdams is an environmentalist. She ran an eco-friendly lifestyle website, GreenIsSexy.org, with two of her friends for five years from 2007 to 2011. Her house is powered by Bullfrog renewable energy. She travels around Toronto by bicycle and does not own a car, but drives when in Los Angeles because it is "a harder town to cycle in". She volunteered in Biloxi, Mississippi and Louisiana in fall of 2005, as part of the clean-up effort following Hurricane Katrina. McAdams sat on a TreeHugger/Live Earth judging panel in 2007. She appealed for donations during the Canada for Haiti telethon in 2010. She was involved in Matter of Trust's "hair boom" efforts following the 2010 Gulf of Mexico oil spill. In 2011, McAdams supported Foodstock, a protest against a proposed limestone mega quarry in Melancthon, Ontario. In 2013, she filmed two promotional videos for the Food & Water First Movement, aiming to preserve prime farmland and source water in Ontario, Canada. In 2014, she narrated the feature documentary Take Me To The River, which investigates what is being done to try to save iconic rivers. In 2021, she participated in a video produced by Stand.earth calling on the government of British Columbia, Canada to stop logging the last old growth rainforests across the province.

Other causes
In 2006, McAdams took part in the "Day Without Immigrants" demonstration in Los Angeles, protesting the federal government's attempts to further criminalize immigrants living illegally in the United States. In 2011, she attended the Occupy Toronto demonstration. In 2013, McAdams volunteered with Habitat for Humanity in her hometown of St. Thomas. She has also worked with charities including the Sunshine Foundation of Canada, the Alzheimer's Association, the READ Campaign, and United Way of Canada. She is a member of Represent.Us, an anti-corruption activist organisation, and is part of its creative council.

Personal life
McAdams had a relationship with her The Notebook co-star Ryan Gosling from 2005 to 2007, before they briefly reunited in 2008. From 2010 to 2013, McAdams was in a relationship with her Midnight in Paris co-star Michael Sheen.

In 2016, McAdams started dating American screenwriter Jamie Linden. In April 2018, she gave birth to her first child with Linden, a son. 

In August 2020, it was reported that McAdams was expecting her second child with Linden. During an interview in May 2022, she confirmed she had given birth to a daughter.

Filmography

Film

Television

Awards and nominations

McAdams has received numerous awards and nominations throughout her career. For her performance in Spotlight, she was awarded a Screen Actors Guild Award, Critics' Choice Movie Award, Satellite Award, and Independent Spirit Award, as well as a nomination for the Academy Award for Best Supporting Actress. McAdams has also been nominated for a BAFTA Rising Star Award and won numerous MTV Movie Awards and Teen Choice Awards.

See also

 List of actors with Academy Award nominations

References

External links

 

21st-century Canadian actresses
21st-century Canadian women writers
1978 births
Actresses from London, Ontario
Actresses from Toronto
Audiobook narrators
Canadian environmentalists
Canadian expatriate actresses in the United States
Canadian film actresses
Canadian people of English descent
Canadian people of Irish descent
Canadian people of Scottish descent
Canadian people of Welsh descent
Best Supporting Actress in a Drama Series Canadian Screen Award winners
Canadian stage actresses
Canadian television actresses
Canadian video game actresses
Canadian voice actresses
Canadian women environmentalists
Environmental bloggers
Living people
Outstanding Performance by a Cast in a Motion Picture Screen Actors Guild Award winners
People from St. Thomas, Ontario
Canadian women bloggers
York University alumni
Canadian bloggers